In mathematics, the Fortuin–Kasteleyn–Ginibre (FKG) inequality is a correlation inequality, a fundamental tool in statistical mechanics and probabilistic combinatorics (especially random graphs and the probabilistic method), due to . Informally, it says that in many random systems, increasing events are positively correlated, while an increasing and a decreasing event are negatively correlated. It was obtained by studying the random cluster model.

One generalization of the FKG inequality is the Holley inequality (1974) below, and an even further generalization is the Ahlswede–Daykin "four functions" theorem (1978). Furthermore, it has the same conclusion as the Griffiths inequalities, but the hypotheses are different.

The inequality
Let  be a finite distributive lattice, and μ a nonnegative function on it, that is assumed to satisfy the (FKG) lattice condition (sometimes a function satisfying this condition is called log supermodular) i.e.,

for all x, y in the lattice .

The same inequality (positive correlation) is true when both ƒ and g are decreasing.  If one is increasing and the other is decreasing, then they are negatively correlated and the above inequality is reversed.

Similar statements hold more generally, when  is not necessarily finite, not even countable.

For proofs, see  or the Ahlswede–Daykin inequality (1978).

Variations on terminology

The lattice condition for μ is also called multivariate total positivity, and sometimes the strong FKG condition; the term (multiplicative) FKG condition is also used in older literature.

The property of μ that increasing functions are positively correlated is also called having positive associations, or the weak FKG condition.

Thus, the FKG theorem can be rephrased as "the strong FKG condition implies the weak FKG condition".

A special case: the Harris inequality

If the lattice  is totally ordered, then the lattice condition is satisfied trivially for any measure μ.

which follows immediately from

Often all the factors (both the lattices and the measures) are identical, i.e., μ is the probability distribution of i.i.d. random variables.

The FKG inequality for the case of a product measure is known also as  the Harris inequality after Harris  , who found and used it in his study of percolation in the plane.

Simple examples

A typical example is the following. Color each hexagon of the infinite honeycomb lattice black with probability  and white with probability , independently of each other. Let a, b, c, d be four hexagons, not necessarily distinct. Let  and  be the events that there is a black path from a to b, and a black path from c to d, respectively. Then the Harris inequality says that these events are positively correlated: . In other words, assuming the presence of one path can only increase the probability of the other.

Similarly, if we randomly color the hexagons inside an  rhombus-shaped hex board, then the events that there is black crossing from the left side of the board to the right side is positively correlated with having a black crossing  from the top side to the bottom. On the other hand, having a left-to-right black crossing is negatively correlated with having a top-to-bottom white crossing, since the first is an increasing event (in the amount of blackness), while the second is decreasing. In fact, in any coloring of the hex board exactly one of these two events happen — this is why hex is a well-defined game.

In the Erdős–Rényi random graph, the existence of a Hamiltonian cycle is negatively correlated with the 3-colorability of the graph, since the first is an increasing event, while the latter is decreasing.

Examples from statistical mechanics
In statistical mechanics, the usual source of measures that satisfy the lattice condition (and hence the FKG inequality) is the following:

Now, if  is a submodular potential (i.e., a family of functions

one for each finite , such that each  is submodular), then one defines the corresponding Hamiltonians as

If μ is an extremal Gibbs measure for this Hamiltonian on the set of configurations , then it is easy to show that μ satisfies the lattice condition, see .

A key example is the Ising model on a graph . Take the following potential:

Submodularity is easy to check; intuitively, taking the min or the max of two configurations tends to decrease the number of disagreeing spins.

A generalization: the Holley inequality

of a monotonically increasing function ƒ on a finite distributive lattice  with respect to two positive functions μ1, μ2 on the lattice  satisfy the condition

provided the functions satisfy the Holley condition (criterion)

for all x, y in the lattice.

Then the Holley inequality states that

which is just the FKG inequality.

As for FKG, the Holley inequality follows from the Ahlswede–Daykin inequality.

Weakening the lattice condition: monotonicity
Consider the usual case of  being a product  for some finite set . The lattice condition on μ is easily seen to imply the following monotonicity, which has the virtue that it is often easier to check than the lattice condition:

Whenever one fixes a vertex  and two configurations φ and ψ outside v such that  for all , the μ-conditional distribution of φ(v) given  stochastically dominates the μ-conditional distribution of ψ(v) given .

Now, if μ satisfies this monotonicity property, that is already enough for the FKG inequality (positive associations) to hold.

The monotonicity of μ implies that the configuration at each step is a monotone function of independent variables, hence the product measure version of Harris implies that it has positive associations. Therefore, the limiting stationary measure μ also has this property.

The monotonicity property has a natural version for two measures, saying that μ1 conditionally pointwise dominates μ2. It is again easy to see that if μ1 and μ2 satisfy the lattice-type condition of the Holley inequality, then  μ1 conditionally pointwise dominates μ2. On the other hand, a Markov chain coupling argument similar to the above, but now without invoking the Harris inequality, shows that conditional pointwise domination, in fact,  implies stochastically domination. Stochastic domination is equivalent to saying that  for all increasing ƒ, thus we get a proof of the Holley inequality. (And thus also a proof of the FKG inequality, without using the Harris inequality.)

See also
Ahlswede–Daykin inequality
 XYZ inequality
 BK inequality

References

 

Inequalities
Statistical mechanics
Covariance and correlation